The 1976 National 500 was a NASCAR Winston Cup Series racing event that took place on October 10, 1976, at Charlotte Motor Speedway in Concord, North Carolina.

By 1980, NASCAR had completely stopped tracking the year model of all the vehicles and most teams did not take stock cars to the track under their own power anymore.

Race report
A souvenir program was offered to the spectators at a cost of $3 USD per copy ($ when adjusted for inflation). Another race took place the previous day known as the World Service Life 300; a companion race that accompanied the National 500 during the course of the 1970s.

The race was held on a dry circuit; with no precipitation recorded around the speedway.

Forty American-born drivers competed at this race; the winner received $22,435 out of the total prize purse ($ when adjusted for inflation). Last-place finisher Al Holbert received only $855 for his engine problem of lap 7 out of the scheduled 334 laps of the race ($ in when adjusted for inflation). Janet Guthrie was the only female competitor in this three-hour-and-thirty-two-minute race. After three cautions for eighteen laps and 26 lead changes, Donnie Allison defeated Cale Yarborough in front of 74500 other people. Had Cale Yarborough won the race, he would have won five consecutive races. A.J. Foyt quit the Hoss Ellington team in the early stages of the race, telling reporters he'd rather build his own cars than drive cars that are "never prepared." The frustrated Foyt quipped that he "couldn't keep that car in a 10 acre bryar patch." Donnie Allison won the race driving Foyt's backup car in a last minute entry.

His next pole position achievement would be at the 1977 World 600. Notable crew chiefs that participated in this race included Junie Donlavey, Jake Elder, Harry Hyde, Dale Inman, Bud Moore, Sterling Marlin and Tim Brewer.

Buck Baker would make his last NASCAR start here before retiring with a 34th-place finish in the books. He would go on to tutor an adolescent Jeff Gordon; who would go on to become one of the best NASCAR drivers in the "modern" era of NASCAR. Hoss Ellington would make his first win as a NASCAR owner while bending the rules so that both his vehicles could compete. Gordon Johncock would also retire from NASCAR after this race.

David Pearson had to get out of his #21 Purolator Mercury in this race. Neil Bonnett, an early retiree in this one, hopped into the Wood Brothers special as a relief driver to help out as the car went on to a top-10 finish. It was something of an early bird cameo in the #21 for Bonnett as he would later replace Pearson as the team's Cup driver in early 1979.

Johnny Rutherford had entered the qualifying session carrying a faulty engine; the car was supposedly "set up" and the crews did not need to work on the chassis. Before he took the green to qualify he stopped and backed up a lap as he was screaming for a wedge adjustment. After eight turns down on the left rear he did put the car in the show. The decision was made to check the chassis and the front end settings were backward and the car had qualified with four inches of bite. As the race progressed Rutherford wanted four turns down on the right rear, which made no sense. The spinout that followed did not eliminate the car from the race but the engine failure down the backstretch did. Engines back then were not turned as tight as today. The tachometer was pegged to the maximum. He had clutched the motor and had to exit the race on lap 208 with a 31st-place finish; 13 places worse than the position that he qualified for.

Qualifying

Top 20 finishers

Timeline
Section reference: 
 Start: David Pearson was leading the other drivers to the green flag to start the first official lap.
 Lap 7: Al Holbert fell out with engine failure.
 Lap 41: A valve stopped working on Gordon Johncock's vehicle.
 Lap 59: A.J. Foyt quit the race despite his vehicle not suffering from any mechanical issues.
 Lap 70: A valve stopped working on Ed Negre's vehicle.
 Lap 80: The clutch stopped functioning on Sam Sommers' vehicle.
 Lap 126: Neil Bonnett fell out with engine failure.
 Lap 144: Bruce Hill fell out with engine failure.
 Lap 148: A valve stopped working on Sonny Easley's vehicle.
 Lap 189: A valve stopped working on Coo Coo Marlin's vehicle.
 Lap 208: Johnny Rutherford managed to blow his vehicle's engine.
 Lap 250: D.K. Ulrich fell out with engine failure.
 Lap 262: A valve stopped working on Dave Marcis' vehicle.
 Lap 268: The rear end of Cecil Gordon's vehicle was forcibly removed in an unsafe manner.
 Finish: Donnie Allison was officially declared the winner of the event.

Standings after the race

References

National 500
National 500
NASCAR races at Charlotte Motor Speedway